, also known as The world's best assassin, To reincarnate in a different world aristocrat, is a Japanese light novel series written by Rui Tsukiyo and illustrated by Reia. It was serialized online from July 2018 to October 2021 on the user-generated novel publishing website Shōsetsuka ni Narō. It was later acquired by Kadokawa Shoten, who have published the series since February 2019 under their Kadokawa Sneaker Bunko imprint.

A manga adaptation with art by Hamao Sumeragi has been serialized online via Kadokawa Shoten's Young Ace Up website since January 2019. Both the light novel and manga have been licensed in North America by Yen Press. An anime television series adaptation produced by Silver Link and Studio Palette aired from October to December 2021.

Premise
The protagonist is an old man who had lived his life as the world's greatest assassin. Due to his advanced age, it was finally decided that he would be able to retire. However, the plane he was on was sabotaged and even his skills as the greatest assassin could not save him. When he died, he was awakened by a goddess who wanted to reincarnate him in a world of swords and magic because she needs his skill set to prevent the destruction of that world at the hands of the Hero. Accepting this request, the protagonist awakens as Lugh Tuatha Dé and swears to finally live his life to its fullest using his skill to save the world.

Characters

The second child and son of Cian and Esri, Lugh is the designated heir of the House of Tuatha Dé, taught in both the arts of medicine and assassination by his father. His older sibling is deceased. He is tasked by the Goddess with the job of killing the Hero after he defeats the Demon Lord as a prophecy revealed that the Hero, drunk on power, would destroy the world himself after defeating the Demon Lord.

Lugh's childhood friend, cousin, as well as his lover, Dia first met Lugh as his teacher in the ability to use magic. She is one of the most powerful mages in her kingdom (Swoigel) and becomes even more powerful with the help of Lugh and his all-around knowledge of the modern world. When the Viekone region is affected by a civil war, Dia's father asks Lugh to safely take Dia into the Tuatha Dé region, where is adopted under the guise of being Lugh's younger sister.

Lugh's assassination assistant, Tarte is a mage saved by Lugh who wholeheartedly entrusts herself to her savior. On the surface, she appears as Lugh's beautiful attendant. She is highly skilled with the use of the spear. She also participates in the interrogation of prisoners. Although she is aware that Lugh only saved her life because of her high magical talent, Tarte decides to dedicate her entire life into being his most dedicated tool, to the point she even develops feelings for him.

Lugh's adopted sister, Maha is yet another mage saved by the machinations of Lugh although at that time, he was known by his alias, Illig Balor. She serves as the CEO of Lugh's cosmetics brand while Lugh is absent. Her role on Lugh's assassination team is information gathering, logistical support and interrogation of prisoners. Much like Tarte, she figures out that Lugh only saved her life because she was useful in his mission, but even so, she develops feelings for him.

Lugh's father, as a Baron he is the current head of House Tuatha Dé. A loving father, he is proud of the fact that his son has absorbed so many of his teachings, especially on the occasion where his son broke his family creed to help his loved one, similar to how Cian himself had done the same to help his own significant other. Though he is unaware Lugh is only a "prodigy" assassin due to his past life.

Lugh's mother, a noblewoman of House Vicorne, thus the reason for Lugh's silver hair, too. She was initially against raising Lugh as an assassin of House Tuatha Dé, but was convinced by her husband, who promised that he would protect Lugh with all of his power. Esri loves to tease her son and often gets into cooking contests with him after teaching him and eventually discovering he was especially skilled in the culinary arts. The anime shows her to put Lugh in dresses; which may be her way of expressing grief at the loss of her baby daughter.

An entity from the afterlife who offers the Assassin the chance to be reborn in another world with his memories intact, but with the condition of killing that world's greatest hero when he reaches the age of 18. She is later revealed to answer to an entity more powerful than her and under that entity's orders, she was instructed to find a suitable teacher for the world's legendary hero, and when the time came, she would find someone to kill that hero.

The legendary assassin who was killed by his own organization and reincarnated as Lugh Tuatha Dé by the Goddess to fulfill a mission. Before his death, he was given the alias of "Allen Smith".

Media

Light novels
The series released volumes on the Shōsetsuka ni Narō website from July 2018 to October 2021. Since February 2019, Kadokawa Shoten started releasing the series in print and has published seven volumes under their Kadokawa Sneaker Bunko imprint. In July 2020, Yen Press announced they licensed the series.

Manga
In January 2019, a manga adaptation by Hamao Sumeragi started serializing in Kadokawa Shoten's Young Ace Up manga website and has been collected in five tankōbon volumes. Yen Press also licensed the manga for an English release.

Anime
An anime television series adaptation by Silver Link and Studio Palette was announced on February 15, 2021. Masafumi Tamura directed the series, with Katsuhiko Takayama writing and overseeing the scripts, Eri Nagata designing the characters, and Kenichi Kuroda composing the music. The series was originally scheduled to premiere in July 2021, but was delayed to October 2021 due to "various circumstances". It aired from October 6 to December 22, 2021 on AT-X and other channels. The opening theme is "Dark seeks light" performed by Yui Ninomiya, while the ending theme is "A Promise" performed by Aira Yūki. 

Crunchyroll licensed the series outside of Asia. On October 28, 2021, Crunchyroll announced the series would receive an English dub, which premiered on November 24, 2021. Muse Communication licensed the series in South and Southeast Asia.

See also
 Redo of Healer — Another light novel series by the same author.

Notes

References

External links
  at Shōsetsuka ni Narō 
  
  
 

2019 Japanese novels
2021 anime television series debuts
Anime and manga based on light novels
Anime postponed due to the COVID-19 pandemic 
AT-X (TV network) original programming
Crunchyroll anime
Fiction about reincarnation
Isekai anime and manga
Isekai novels and light novels
Japanese webcomics
Kadokawa Shoten manga
Kadokawa Sneaker Bunko
Kadokawa Dwango franchises
Light novels
Light novels first published online
Muse Communication
Seinen manga
Shōsetsuka ni Narō
Silver Link
Webcomics in print
Works about human trafficking
Yen Press titles